Mic Check may refer to:

 "Mic Check" (Hadouken! song), a song by Hadouken!
 "Mic Check" (Juelz Santana song), a song by Juelz Santana
"Mic Check", a recording on the B-side of Imogen Heap's single "Headlock"
"Mic Check", a song by the Italian rapper Noyz Narcos featuring Salmo